Port Discovery may refer to
 Port Discovery (Tokyo DisneySea) – Tokyo DisneySea's Themed land
 Port Discovery (museum) – an Inner Harbor, Baltimore, Maryland, children's museum
 Port Discovery, Washington – George Vancouver's landing point on the Strait of Juan de Fuca